Nicolás Ezequiel Giménez (born 16 January 1996) is an Argentine professional footballer who plays as an attacking midfielder for Baniyas.

Career
Giménez's career started with Nueva Chicago. He was promoted into their first-team in March 2015, when he made his professional debut in a 2–1 loss away from home against Gimnasia y Esgrima. It occurred during the 2015 Primera División season, which included three goals in fourteen appearances as Nueva Chicago were relegated. In Primera B Nacional, Giménez netted eight goals in twenty-one matches to help the club finish seventh. On 5 July 2016, newly-promoted Primera División team Talleres signed Giménez. He scored his first goal in November 2017 versus Arsenal de Sarandí.

July 2018 saw Giménez depart on loan to Primera División team San Martín. Two goals, against Banfield and Huracán, across twenty-two appearances followed as the club suffered relegation. Giménez remained in the top-flight for 2019–20 after signing temporary terms with Arsenal de Sarandí. He netted goals against Godoy Cruz, Unión Santa Fe, Racing Club, River Plate, Lanús, Patronato and Aldosivi in the curtailed, due to the COVID-19 pandemic, campaign. In July 2020, Giménez was loaned to the United Arab Emirates with Pro League outfit Baniyas; penning a contract until mid-2021.

Giménez, after a friendly goal against Al Ain, scored three goals in his first three competitive games for Baniyas, as a debut goal versus Al-Wasl was followed by strikes in victories over Fujairah and Khor Fakkan. He went goalless across his next two appearances, before scoring in a League Cup first round encounter with Hatta on 12 November. After then going twelve matches without a goal, Giménez netted twice in a 3–3 draw away to Al Jazira on 18 February.

Career statistics
.

References

External links

1996 births
Living people
People from La Matanza Partido
Argentine footballers
Association football midfielders
Argentine expatriate footballers
Argentine Primera División players
Primera Nacional players
UAE Pro League players
Nueva Chicago footballers
Talleres de Córdoba footballers
San Martín de Tucumán footballers
Arsenal de Sarandí footballers
Baniyas Club players
Expatriate footballers in the United Arab Emirates
Argentine expatriate sportspeople in the United Arab Emirates
Sportspeople from Buenos Aires Province